Dominica Passage is a strait in the Caribbean. It separates the islands of Dominica, from Marie-Galante, Guadeloupe. It is a pathway from the Caribbean Sea into the Atlantic Ocean.

See also 
 Dominica–France Maritime Delimitation Agreement

References

Straits of the Caribbean
Bodies of water of Dominica
Straits of Guadeloupe
Dominica–Guadeloupe border
International straits